Chen Baoqiu (born 30 January 1911, date of death unknown) was a Chinese athlete. He competed in the men's shot put at the 1936 Summer Olympics.

References

1911 births
Year of death missing
Athletes (track and field) at the 1936 Summer Olympics
Chinese male shot putters
Olympic athletes of China
Place of birth missing